Phoenix is a web development framework written in the functional programming language Elixir. Phoenix uses a server-side model–view–controller (MVC) pattern. Based on the Plug library, and ultimately the Cowboy Erlang framework, it was developed to provide highly performant and scalable web applications. In addition to the request/response functionality provided by the underlying Cowboy server, Phoenix provides soft realtime communication to external clients through WebSockets or long polling using its language agnostic channels feature.

Two notable features of Phoenix are LiveView and HEEx. LiveView provides real-time user experiences with server-rendered HTML. HEEx is Phoenix's templating language.

See also 

 Comparison of web frameworks
 Elixir (programming language)
 Mix (build tool)

References

External links 
 

Free software
Software using the MIT license
Web frameworks